II is the second studio album by Canadian noise rock band METZ, released internationally on May 4, 2015, on Sub Pop. It was released a day later in North America. II was produced by the band, and engineered by Alex Bonenfant and Graham Walsh. The album received mostly positive reviews.

Reception

On Metacritic, II has a score of 78 out of 100, indicating "generally favorable reviews" based on 23 reviews.

The album was a long-listed nominee for the 2015 Polaris Music Prize.

Track listing
 "Acetate" - 3:55
 "The Swimmer" - 2:41
 "Spit You Out" - 4:49
 "Zzyzx" - 0:34
 "I.O.U." - 2:52
 "Landfill" - 2:42 
 "Nervous System" - 2:09
 "Wait in Line" - 3:16
 "Eyes Peeled" - 2:33
 "Kicking a Can of Worms" - 4:19

Charting

References

2015 albums
Metz (band) albums
Sub Pop albums